Raphael Homer "Ray" Bryant (December 24, 1931 – June 2, 2011) was an American jazz pianist, composer, and arranger.

Early life
Bryant was born in Philadelphia, Pennsylvania, on December 24, 1931. His mother was an ordained minister who had taught herself to play the piano; his father also played the piano and sang. His brothers were the bass player Tommy, drummer and singer Len, and Lynwood. Ray began playing the piano around the age of six or seven, following the example of his mother and his sister, Vera. Gospel influences in his playing came from being part of the church at this stage in his early life. He had switched from classical music to jazz by his early teens and played the double bass at junior high school. He was first paid to play when he was 12: "I would play for dances, and they'd sneak me into bars. I'd get four or five bucks a night, which was good money then." He turned professional aged 14, and immediately joined a local band led by Mickey Collins.

Later life and career

1946–1958
After three years working on and off in Collins's band, Bryant toured with guitarist Tiny Grimes (1948–49). He was then a solo pianist based in Syracuse, New York for a year. After returning to Philadelphia, he played Dixieland in Billy Kretchmer's club for around two years. He attracted more attention after becoming house pianist at the Blue Note club in Philadelphia in 1953. He was there until 1956, accompanying many leading players such as Lester Young, Charlie Parker, Miles Davis, and Sonny Stitt. Davis and Sonny Rollins both liked Bryant's playing enough to record with him in New York in 1955: on Quintet/Sextet and Work Time, respectively.

These albums were for Prestige Records, for whom Bryant "began a period as an occasional house pianist", also recording with "Art Taylor (1957), Tiny Grimes and Coleman Hawkins (both 1958–9), [...] and as a leader (1957–8)." In this period, he was also the accompanist for singer Carmen McRae (1956–57). Bryant was a member of trumpeter Dizzy Gillespie's small and big bands for four months in 1957. Bryant recorded under drummer Art Blakey for several studio albums in 1957–58. Decades later, he commented: "The sessions I recorded with him helped put me on the map as a musician". Bryant was also part of drummer Jo Jones's trio in 1958. The pianist was able to learn from Jones: "He could sense when you weren't relaxed and would say, 'Take your time and breathe!' He also taught me about pacing a set. I still use his format today," commented Bryant around 2004.

1959–1971
Bryant settled in New York in 1959. There, he played both mainstream jazz and the newer hard bop. His earlier period at the Blue Note in Philadelphia helped him get work, as he already knew a lot of the musicians who were based in New York.

For three months in 1959, Bryant was the pianist in singer Ella Fitzgerald's small band. Bryant recorded with "Hal Singer, Arnett Cobb, Benny Golson, Lem Winchester, and Oliver Nelson" in 1959.

For around ten years from this point, his own trio contained bassists including Tommy Bryant and Jimmy Rowser, and drummers including Walter Perkins, Mickey Roker, Grady Tate, and Freddie Waits. He formed his own trio and was signed by producer and talent scout John Hammond to Columbia Records in 1960. Their first album contained the hit single "Little Susie", a blues created when Bryant was with Jones. Signature Records responded immediately by releasing their own version of Bryant playing the same tune. This version, sold as "Little Susie (Part 4)", reached No. 12 on the Billboard Hot R&B chart.

Hammond also paired Bryant with singer Aretha Franklin for the album Aretha: With The Ray Bryant Combo in 1960. Bryant was in Baltimore with Hammond when the Madison dance craze was developing and, at the producer's suggestion, adapted an earlier composition for the dance – it was renamed "Madison Time". This reached No. 30 on the Billboard Hot 100 chart in 1960. Another Bryant single – "Sack o' Woe" – appeared on the R&B chart in 1961.

In 1963, Bryant switched to Sue Records and recorded the first of four albums for the label. Three years later he was with Cadet Records, "which recorded him in a variety of contexts, from trio to orchestral. The range of material was also varied, mixing jazz standards with pop hits of the day." Despite not having studied arranging formally, Bryant also fulfilled this role for several horn and strings charts for Cadet.

He had another top 100 hit with a cover version of Bobbie Gentry's "Ode to Billie Joe" in 1967. The crossover success that Bryant had irritated some jazz purists, but the pianist maintained that he was unconcerned and had been playing such material in clubs for years before the recordings became commercially successful.

Tommy and Ray Bryant formed a trio, with Oz Perkins as the back-up band, for the off-Broadway run of the comedy show Cambridge Circus, at Square East in 1964. The show starred John Cleese, Bill Oddie, Tim Brooke-Taylor, David Hatch, Jo Kendall, Graham Chapman, Jonathan Lynn, and Jean Hart.

1972–2011
"It was usually in a trio, duo or solo context that Bryant chose to perform and record for the remainder of his career". A performance at the 1972 Montreux Jazz Festival led to Bryant also getting more work as a solo pianist. This was his first trip to Europe and Bryant was nervous about playing to an audience of thousands, but the performance was a success, and was released as the album Alone at Montreux by Atlantic Records. He also toured Europe frequently from the 1970s. He also played electric piano in the 1970s.

In 1982, he was the guest on Marian McPartland's Piano Jazz radio program. In the following year, he played in New York in a trio led by saxophonist Buddy Tate.

Between 1976 and 1980, Bryant recorded five albums for Pablo Records. For the following seven years, he did not record as a leader: "The record companies didn't bother me and I didn't bother them", he later commented. This ended when an admiring producer for Japanese Polygram recruited him: Bryant recorded 10 albums for them (also released on EmArcy) between 1987 and 1995. His 1989 album All Mine and Yours contained only his own compositions, and was recorded while touring Japan.

In the mid-1990s he recorded with Ray Brown and Lewis Nash as a trio, toured internationally as an unaccompanied soloist, and visited Japan and Europe in the group 100 Golden Fingers". He played with Benny Golson in New York in 1997.

In the 2000s, most of his performances were in Europe and Japan, and he reduced his schedule. Solo piano recordings from performances at Rutgers University in 2004 and 2008 were released on the CD In the Back Room.

Bryant died on June 2, 2011, at the age of 79 in Queens, New York, after a long illness.

Family
From 1975 to 1982, he was married to pioneering Philadelphia news broadcaster Edie Huggins.  The musicians Kevin Eubanks, Duane Eubanks, and Robin Eubanks are the sons of Bryant's sister, Vera.

Playing and composing style
Bryant's style was initially influenced by pianists Art Tatum and Teddy Wilson, but blues and gospel elements soon grew stronger in his playing. Bryant was not known as an innovator, but had a readily recognisable style of his own. Bryant said that he liked to transfer elements of the Count Basie Orchestra to the piano. A writer commented that Bryant's "solo works are often like carefully crafted sonatas with dramatic changes in mood, tempo and dynamics".

"Bryant had a firm touch and an unshakable sense of time, notably in his left hand, which he often used to build a bedrock vamp. Even in a bebop setting, he favored the ringing tonalities of the gospel church." "In his solo playing, [...] he often played blues figures in the right hand against stride or boogie-woogie patterns in the left. On his recordings as an accompanist the influence of blues and boogie-woogie is less strong and he plays in a variety of styles."

Bryant was also a composer, with well-known themes such as "Cubano Chant", "The Madison Time", "Monkey Business", and "Little Susie" to his credit. He said that he did not consciously endeavor to compose music: "An idea will just come to me while I'm doing something else and if it sticks, I develop it into a tune." Ed Berger wrote in JazzTimes that his compositions "share many of the attractive melodic and rhythmic qualities that make his playing so widely accessible", and vary in style from Latin, blues-based, to more lyrical ballads, waltzes and calypsos.

Discography

As leader

As sideman

References

External links
Ray Bryant Discography

1931 births
2011 deaths
American jazz pianists
American male pianists
Bebop pianists
Jazz-blues pianists
Mainstream jazz pianists
Musicians from Philadelphia
Soul-jazz pianists
Sue Records artists
Prestige Records artists
20th-century American pianists
African-American jazz pianists
Jazz musicians from Pennsylvania
20th-century American male musicians
American male jazz musicians
Black & Blue Records artists
20th-century African-American musicians
21st-century African-American people
EmArcy Records artists